Free energy may refer to:

Science

 Free energy perturbation, a method based on statistical mechanics used in computational chemistry
 Free energy principle, a variational formulation of self-organisation in biological systems, applied in particular to neuroscience
 Free-energy relationship, a relationship in physical organic chemistry 
 Principle of minimum energy, a thermodynamic formulation based on the second law
 Thermodynamic free energy, the energy in a physical system that can be converted to do work, including:
 Gibbs free energy
 Landau free energy (also known as grand potential)
 Helmholtz free energy
 Variational free energy, a construct from information theory that is used in variational Bayesian methods

Pseudoscience
 Free energy device, a hypothetical perpetual motion device that is supposedly capable of drawing energy from a hidden free energy field, which is unknown in science
 Free energy suppression conspiracy theory, in which advanced energy technologies are suppressed by governments or special interest groups
 History of perpetual motion machines, history of devices supposedly capable of drawing unlimited energy

Other uses
 In economics, energy from sources that do not require an input which has to be paid for (usually a sub-set of renewable energy)
 Free Energy (band), a 5-piece rock band on DFA Records